Abraham Seneor or Abraham Senior  (Segovia 1412 - 1493) was a Sephardic rabbi, banker, politician, patriarch of the Coronel family and last Crown rabbi of Castile, a senior member of the Castilian hacienda (almojarife of the Castile or royal administrator). In 1492, at the age of 80, he converted to Roman Catholicism, taking the name Ferran, Fernan or Fernando Pérez Coronel, thus founding the noble lineage of Coronel.

The Seneor family
The Seneor family, from the 1460s, were the largest group engaged in tax farming for the Crown of Castile. The Seneor family was also involved in politics, defending the interests of artisans in the cities of central Castile.  He was related to Andrés Cabrera (the steward of King Henry IV of Castile), Andrés Cabrera's wife, Beatriz de Bobadilla (lady of the Queen Isabella of Castile) and Alonso Quintanilla, Count of Accounts, to whom the Infante (crown prince) Alfonso had entrusted the establishment of a mint in Medina del Campo (a city enriched by the fairs). In 1488 Seneor became treasurer of  the Holy Brotherhood (founded in 1476 and counting Quintanilla among its members).

Isabella's courtier
His position at court was so important, it was not limited to his duties as the kingdom's most important tax farmer. In 1469 he played a major role in securing the marriage of the Infanta Isabella of Castile to Ferdinand of Aragon, including providing the betrothal gifts.  

In 1473 he had a hand in the reconciliation between Isabella and her estranged brother Henry IV, and, in 1474, in providing the Alcázar of Segovia (whose warden was Andrés Cabrera) as a place for Isabella to hide following the death of her brother, the king.  Isabella had such confidence in Seneor that, in gratitude for his  services, she endowed him with a lifetime pension of 100,000 maravedis, confirmed in 1480 at the behest of the royal confessor Hernando de Talavera. Seneor was appointed chief justice of the Jewish community of Segovia, (often clashing with converted Jews and their families) 12 and rab do la corte (court Rabbi or chief rabbi of Castile); an office for which, like many of his predecessors, the Jewish religious authorities thought him unqualified. He was so respected by the Jewish grandees, however,  that the Cortes of Toledo in 1480  presented him with 50,000 maravedis.  He was a close friend of  Isaac Abravanel, whom he worked with in tax collection.  In the War of Granada Seneor and Abravanel played a valuable role both in raising taxes and provisioning Isabella's army, while Samuel Abolafia was in charge of recruitment. They also supported Columbus's efforts to secure Isabella's patronage for  the proposed transatlantic expedition of Christopher Columbus.

Senior actively intervened in support of the cause of the Jewish community, which was coming under increasing pressure. Through their efforts, they managed to raise among the Castilian aljamas a large sum of money to allow the Jews captured in Málaga to be ransomed.  After failing to prevent the decree expelling the Jews from Spain (the Edict of Granada issued (31 March 1492), despite their offer of a large sum of money, Seneor (an old man of 80 years), together with others of his family chose conversion to Catholicism, while his friend Abravanel (55) chose to keep his religion and left for Naples.

The conversion of Abraham Seneor was expected to have a major impact on the political strategy of the Catholic Monarchs, so it was carefully staged, publicized and surrounded by all appropriate solemnities. In a ceremony held on June 15, 1492 in the monastery of Guadalupe and conducted by the Primate of All Spain, Seneor was baptized and took his Christian name, Fernando (after his godfather, King Ferdinand himself), and the surname Perez Coronel (chosen from the extinct noble lineage Coronel).

Within a few days of his conversion, whose sincerity was discussed, he  became a ruler of Segovia, a member of the Royal Council and chief accountant of Prince Juan. During the expulsion Seneor continued to play a key financial role in assisting others in the Jewish community forced to leave Spain.

The Coronel family
The Coronel family remained one of the most important families of Segovia in the sixteenth century. In 1493, the children of Abraham/Fernando, Juan Perez Coronel and Inigo Lopez Coronel, inherited his position in the business partnership with Luis de Alcalá and brother-in-law Mayr Melamed/Fernan Núñez Coronel. Inigo was also ruler of Segovia, and the lifting of the Communities was treasurer of the rebels.  A daughter, Maria Coronel, had married in 1510  Juan Bravo, a future leader of the rebel Comuneros in the Castilian Revolt of the Comuneros. 
A Pedro Fernandez Coronel, probably the son of Fernan Nunez Coronel, participated in the second voyage of Columbus, (who spoke of him in glowing terms,) and was appointed Constable of the Indies (with a salary of 15,000 maravedis a year). Back in Spain, he acted as a godfather at the baptism ceremony of the first Native American Indian, giving him the name of Peter (July 29, 1496, in the same monastery of Guadalupe where he was baptized a few years before).
Abraham Seneor's house in Segovia, in the Jewish quarter or neighborhood of the Coronel, became a Franciscan convent  in 1902, and currently houses the Educational Centre of the Jewish quarter. The Monastery of Santa María del Parral still houses the chapel of Calvary of the Coronel family, and contains the tombs of Abraham/Fernando, his brother Paul Coronel (secretary of Cardinal Cisneros and professor of Hebrew at the University of Alcala, where he spoke at the Complutense Polyglot) and his granddaughter, Maria Coronel. Other prominent members of the family were Luis Nunez Coronel (nephew of Abraham, theologian, professor at the Sorbonne, Secretary of Alonso de Fonseca and friend of Erasmus of Rotterdam) and Paul Nunez Coronel (Sorbonne professor and rector of Montague College, where he met Erasmus). The outstanding physician Andrés Laguna was a neighbor of the Coronel family.

Not all the descendants of Rabbi Abraham Senior, also known as Fernán Pérez Coronel, truly embraced Catholicism. Some were denounced as New Christian judaizers (secret Jews) and, punished by the Inquisition, lost their possessions and even were deported to Brazil. Other descendants fled to lands more tolerant to Jews, such as Duarte Saraiva (born 1572), who escaped to Holland, where he adopted the name David Senior Coronel and subsequently went to Brazil, where he was considered the richest man in Dutch Brazil. Rabbi Menasseh Ben Israel (1604–57) dedicated his book, Conciliador, to Perez Coronel. Pérez Coronel descendants are scattered around the world, some in Israel, others in Brazil, Ecuador, Mexico, Venezuela, Holland, and the United States.

Notable descendants
 Benjamin Cardozo, American lawyer and jurist who served as an Associate Justice of the Supreme Court of the United States. 
 David Senior Coronel, Dutch colonial businessman and founder of the Jewish community in Recife, Brazil.
 Fernando Coronel, Ecuadorian contractor who helped British Petroleum drill Ecuador's first oil well "Ancon 1".
 Gabriel Coronel, Venezuelan theater and TV actor, singer, and model.
 María Josefa Coronel, Ecuadorian journalist.
 Tim Coronel, Dutch auto racing driver and twin brother of Tom.
 Tom Coronel, Dutch auto racing driver and twin brother of Tim.
 Uri Coronel, Dutch sports director (AFC Ajax).
 Nassau Senior, author of the British Poor Law Amendment Act 1834. 
 Jaap Nunes Vaz, Dutch journalist and editor for the underground newspaper Het Parool in WWII.
 Candido Pinheiro Coren de Lima, Brazilian writer

References

Pasajes citados en La pintura de historia del siglo XIX en España, 1992, Madrid: Museo del Prado, pg. 454-459. La obra de Prescott es Historia de los Reyes Católicos, D. Fernando y Dª Isabel, 1848, Biblioteca del Siglo. Volúmenes 3-4, pg. 61. Hay otras versiones similares de la intervención de Torquemada (Judas Iscariote vendió a su maestro por 30 dineros de plata, vuestras altezas lo van a vender por 30.000, ahí lo tenéis, tomadle y vendedle, vendedle vosotros por más precio y entregadle a sus enemigos, que yo me descargo de este oficio, vosotros daréis a Dios cuenta de vuestro contrato -citado en adecara.com, consultado el 13/09/2010-).

Jewish Encyclopedia». recoge la forma Senior. La bibliografía española (por ejemplo Luis Suárez Fernández o Miguel Ángel Ladero Quesada) recoge la forma Seneor. La forma Senneor es la usada en los recursos turísticos de Segovia (turismodesegovia.com). Las citas de fuentes primarias recogen todas esas formas, e incluso otras, como Abrahem Seneor o Habrahan Senior.

Richard Ayoun y Haïm Vidal Séphiha, Sefardíes de ayer y hoy, EDAF, 2002,  pg. 89.

«Tomas de Torquemada». en mundohistoria.org (consultado el 23/08/2009).

«Cronología de los judeoespañoles»., en sefarad.rediris.es

Pérez en Jewish Encyclopedia, Núñez en Documentos sobre la expulsión en sefarad.rediris.es. y en Luis Suárez Fernández (La expulsión de los judíos -Mapfre, 1991, -, reproducido en vallenajerilla.com). La duda sobre el apellido proviene de los documentos de la época (el Cronicón de Valladolid, del doctor de Toledo), de engorrosa redacción, que originó lecturas dispares (C. Carrete Parrondo, citado por María Fuencisla García Casar Nuevas noticas sobre los Seneor-Coronel segovianos, en Del pasado judío en los reinos medievales hispánicos: afinidad y distanciamiento, Universidad de Castilla La Mancha, 2005, pg. 138.

La bibliografía citada por Jewish Encyclopedia, fuente utilizada para todo este artículo, es la siguiente:
Liḳḳuṭim Shonim, Padua: Lattes, 1869, pg. 60 y ss.;
Mariana, De Rebus Hispaniœ, libro XXIV, en Colección de Documentos Inéditos para la Historia de España, XIII, Madrid, 1848 pg. 195 y ss.;
Ríos, Hist. III, pgs. 279, 296;
Kayserling, Christopher Columbus, pgs. 22, 46;
idem, Gesch. der Juden in Portugal, pgs. 83, 102.

En El Tesorero Alonso Gutiérrez y su capilla en San Martín. Notas y documentos sobre patronazgo artístico en el Madrid del Quinientos, de M. Ángeles Toajas Roger (Anales de Historia del Arte nº 15, 2005, pgs. 87-125), se refiere cómo un grupo financiero rival intenta la puja para el arrendamiento de las rentas del partido de Medina del Campo del período 1487-1489; intentan arrebatar este negocio a la familia de Abraham Seneor, el poderoso judío segoviano, máxima autoridad de las aljamas de Castilla y también cabeza de un grupo financiero que venía arrendando las principales rentas de Castilla desde veinte años atrás. (pg. 91).

Abraham Seneor monta y lidera lo que podríamos llamar el partido burgués, de ciudadanos por la paz, con Alonso Quintanilla, el banquero de Medina, y con Beatriz de Bobadilla, la dama de Isabel, y su esposo Andrés Cabrera, el mayordomo de Enrique IV. Con Quintanilla pone en marcha la Santa Hermandad, de la que es tesorero. Enrique de Diego, El último rabino (Homo Legens, 2009). La condición de pariente de Andrés Cabrera o Andrés de Cabrera se cita en Jewish Encyclopedia. El acceso a la tesorería de Senior fue el 15 de agosto de 1488, varios años posterior a la fundación de la Santa Hermandad (1476), pues el primer tesorero (o al menos el que lo era desde 1480) había sido Pedro González de Madrid. La compañía de arrendadores de Senior formada para esa ocasión estaba compuesta también por su yerno Meir Melamed (Mayr Malamed) y por Luis de Alcalá, regidor de Madrid, que se obligó en nombre de todos ellos (Miguel Ángel Ladero Quesada La Hermandad de Castilla: cuentas y memoriales, 1480–1498, Real Academia de la Historia, 2005, pg. 23).

Yolanda Moreno Koch, Ricardo Izquierdo Benito, Del pasado judío en los reinos medievales hispánicos: afinidad y distanciamiento, Universidad de Castilla La Mancha, 2005,  pg. 137.

La lista de colaboradores hebreos que compone Luis Suárez Fernández (Isabel la Católica vista desde la Academia, Real Academia de la Historia, 2005, page 52) incluye, además de a Abraham Senior y otros dos personajes estrechamente relacionados con él -Mayr Malamed e Isaac Abravanel-, a Vidal Astori y Vidal Benveniste).

Cuando en 1485 el converso Juan de Talavera fue recibido como escribano de la aljama, se opuso, y fue acusado por el hermano de éste (Yucé). Entre las acusaciones que se cruzaron con este motivo, Abraham Senior fue acusado de irregularidades en el reparto de impuestos, de encargar la muerte de tres conversos en otras ocasiones e intentar hacer lo mismo con Juan de Talavera en ésta; mientras que Juan de Talavera fue acusado de hechicería. Llegado el asunto al Consejo de Castilla, se encargó al corregidor de Segovia que pusiera paz sin tomar al pie de la letra las acusaciones; se ignora si el asunto tuvo consecuencias inquisitoriales para Juan de Talavera. (Luis Suárez Fernández Los Reyes Católicos: La expansión de la fe, Rialp, 1990, pg. 98; y Eloy Benito Ruano y otros Juderías y sinagogas de la Sefarad medieval, Universidad de Castilla La Mancha, 2003, pg. 394).

R. David Messer León, en su comentario sobre el nombramiento de un rab de la corte de Castilla, dice "que carecían de conocimiento y temor de Dios (kemo shehokiaḥ sofo 'al teḥillato,). "R. E. J." xxiv. 135. Fuente citada en Jewish Encyclopedia. Uno de sus predecesores fue Pablo de Santa María, que también terminó como converso.

«Jewish Encyclopedia».. Para el cargo de factor general véase Una contribución a la historia de la contabilidad, Universidad de Sevilla, 1996, pg. 68; y Carlos Álvarez Nogal, El factor general del Rey y las finanzas de la Monarquía Hispánica, en Revista de Historia Económica, 1999.

Daniel Mesa Los judíos en el Descubrimiento de América, en Repertorio Histórico de la Academia Antioqueña de Historia, 1989, nº 252.

Eloy Benito Ruano Tópicos y realidades de la Edad Media, Volumen 1, Real Academia de la Historia, 2000, pg. 251.

Joseph Pérez Los judíos en España, Marcial Pons Historia, 2005, pg. 190.

En Valladolid según Jewish Encyclopedia. En Guadalupe según Enrique de Diego op. cit. y Miguel Ángel Ladero Quesada (Coronel, 1492: de la aristocracia judía a la nobleza cristiana de los Reyes Católicos, Cahiers du CRIAR, n° 21, 2002, pg. 43, donde reproduce una fuente contemporánea).

Ladero Quesada (op. cit., pg. 44) cita al heraldista Diego Hernández de Mendoza como fuente para la causa de la elección del apellido Coronel. La excepcionalidad de esta forma de reconocimiento de hidalguía, en el mismo author, pg. 45. El anterior apellido Coronel aparece en la aristocracia castellana al menos desde María Alfonso Coronel, dama del siglo XIII, casada con Guzmán el Bueno, cuyos descendientes llevaron los apellidos Pérez de Guzmán.
David Raphael (The Alhambra Decree, Carmi House Press, 1988, citado en Blanca Isabel de Lima Urdaneta, Coro: fin de diáspora: Isaac A. Senior e hijo: redes comerciales, Fondo Editorial Humanidades, 2002, pg. 16) indica que "Perez-Co-Ronel" puede leerse en una mezcla de castellano y hebreo como "perezco cantando a Dios", mientras que "Núñez Coronel", leído como "No-Nizco-Ronel" significaría "recordaremos cantando a Dios".
El concepto de "hidalguía de solar conocido" es también a veces referida como "de linaje", una forma particular de la "nobleza de esencia" y relacionada habitualmente con la zona cantábrica, donde se encontraban la mayor parte de esos solares iniciales de la nobleza castellana (Iuria vasconiae nº 3, FEDHAV, 2006, pgs. 286 y 301).

Suegro según Bernáldez ("Historia de los Reyes Católicos", p. 336, Sevilla, 1870); cuñado según Elias Capsali (ver "Liḳḳuṭim Shonim ", ed. Lattes, p. 73, Padua, 1869). Fuentes citadas en Jewish Encyclopedia. Yerno según Luis Suárez Fernández op. cit.; quien deja indicada la causa de la confusión possible entre ambos apellidos: Abraham Seneor, el Rabino Mayor, y su yerno Mayr Malamed, se bautizaron siendo apadrinados por los propios reyes, y pasaron a llamarse Fernando Núñez Coronel y Fernando Pérez Coronel, respectivamente. En el documento citado por Ladero Quesada (op. cit.), la ambigüedad a la hora de referirse a los dos personajes deja confuso ese punto. La forma Meír se recoge por Richard Ayoun y Haïm Vidal Séphiha, op. cit. La forma Mair se recoge por Jewish Encyclopedia.

Dado assiento que al día siguiente se baptizaría con solemnidad, partiose de sus atezas y fue a la sinagoga an orar con los otros judíos (Martín Montesdeoca, 1556, citado en Eugenio Asensio, Delia Luisa López De Fray Luis de Leon a Quevedo y otros estudios Universidad de Salamanca, 2005, pg. 56. Dicen que murió recitando una plegaria: el Shemá (Sefarad de Pablo A. Chami, citado por Ignacio López Calvo La sinagoga secreta de los criptojudíos de Segovia, El Adelantado, 27 de enero de 2010). Odaya Bend ha identificado una sala de oraciones que podría haber sido usada como sinagoga secreta de la comunidad de marranos de Segovia (citado por Ignacio López, op. cit.)

Joseph Pérez, op. cit.

«Documentos sobre la expulsión». en sefarad.rediris.es. (consultado el 23/8/2010)

por algunos judíos al tiempo que estavan en estos nuestros reynos les heran devidas grandes contías de maravedíes e pan e otras cosas algunas, por rasón de las nuestras rentas que de ellos tenían arrendadas por mayor o por menor, como otros porque tenían de ellos y con su poder cargo de las reçebir e recabdar como sus fatores o en otra manera, e que estos tales tenían otras debdas que les debían christianos, e que de las tales debdas algunos de los dichos judíos les ovieron hecho çesión o trespasamiento, porque sonavan las obligaciones an ellos aunque en la verdad heran para los dichos Luys de Alcalá y Hernán Núñez. Citado en Miguel Ángel Ladero Quesada La receptoría y pagaduría general de la Hacienda regia castellana entre 1491 y 1494. (De Rabí Meír Melamed a Fernán Núñez Coronel), en En la España Medieval nº 25, 2002, pg. 434, 

«Judería de Segovia»., en turismodesegovia.com (consultado el 23/8/2010).

Ladero Quesada La receptoría..., pg. 345.

Enrique de Diego, El último rabino, reproducido en La lucha por la libertad de Abraham Seneor y los Coronel.

En algunas fuentes se la recoge como su hija; pero por las fechas es mucho más probable que sea nieta de Abraham Senior. Como hija de Íñigo López Coronel la refiere Peñalosa: Juan Bravo y la familia Coronel, citado por Joseph Pérez La Revolución de las Comunidades de Castilla, Siglo XXI, 1998, pg. 479).

István Szászdi León-Borja, Las élites de los cristianos nuevos: Alianza y vasallaje en la expansión atlántica, 1485–1520

José Luis Lacave Juderías y Sinagogas Españolas, citado por Liliana y Marcelo Benveniste La Sinagoga en la casa de Abraham Seneor en Segovia: “ni tan perdida ni tan secreta” (Esefarad, 24 de junio de 2010), donde se recogen fotografías y más información sobre su possible ubicación actual. Véase también una filmación de esa visita en YouTube.

En el lugar donde se levantaba la casa-palacio de Abraham Seneor, en la calle de la Judería Vieja esquina con la calle de la Puerta del Sol, encontramos hoy un edificio en rehabilitación propiedad del Obispado de Segovia, que fuera otrora un convento de Franciscanos con acceso por la calle de la Judería Vieja, cercano a la entrada del Centro de Didáctico de la Judería de Segovia con el cual comparte el terreno que ocupaba la casa, al que también se accede por la calle de Santa Ana (Benveniste, op. cit.). También hace referencia al convento de franciscanos Enrique de Diego, op. cit.. La Casa de Abraham Senneor, también conocida como de Andrés Laguna (en el camino que va de la Antigua Sinagoga Mayor a la Puerta de San Andrés), acoge actualmente el Centro Didáctico de la Judería (véanse fotografías y más información en turismodesegovia.com [3] [4] y en arqueologiamedieval.com). No debe confundirse con otro convento franciscano de Segovia: en otra ubicación existió un Convento de San Francisco (Segovia), que después de la desamortización (1836) fue ocupado por dependencias de la Academia de Artillería de Segovia situada en el Alcázar; actualmente aloja el Museo de la Academia de Artillería (la calle sigue llamándose de San Francisco). wikimapia.org; turismodesegovia.com

Enrique de Diego, op. cit.

Enrique de Diego, op. cit.

Agustín Redondo Del personaje de don Diego Coronel a una nueva interpretación de "El Buscón", AIH Actas V, 1974, pg. 700 (recogido en Centro Virtual Cervantes).
The fame of the Colonel was so widespread, that already in the seventeenth century, Francisco de Quevedo uses his name (with the obvious connotations for readers aware of the time) in a character in The Searcher : Diego Coronel, student service Noble from entering the protagonist, who suffers with its famous university misadventures.

External links
 https://web.archive.org/web/20150420114257/http://jewishencyclopedia.com/articles/13423-senior-abraham

1412 births
1493 deaths
15th-century Castilian Jews
Converts to Roman Catholicism from Judaism
Spanish Roman Catholics
15th-century businesspeople